Anthoxanthum occidentale is a species of grass known by the common name California sweetgrass. It is a close relative of the more widely known sweet grass. It is native to the west coast of the United States from Washington to California, where it grows in the coniferous forests of the coastal mountain ranges. This is a rhizomatous perennial grass with leaves up to 30 centimeters long and 1.5 wide. The stem reaches a meter in height with an inflorescence of 7 to 10 centimeters. The spikelets grow on short, wavy stalks and each has three florets with long, protruding stamens during flowering.

References

External links
Jepson Manual Treatment
USDA Plants Profile
Photo gallery

Flora of California
Flora of Oregon
Flora of Washington (state)
Pooideae
Flora of North America
Flora without expected TNC conservation status
Plants described in 1985